Mariko Daouda (born 13 November 1981 in Abidjan, Côte d'Ivoire) is a retired Ivorian footballer.

Honours
Dinamo București
Supercupa României: 2005

References

External links
 
 
 

1981 births
Living people
Ivorian footballers
Ivorian expatriate footballers
Association football defenders
AC Bellinzona players
FC U Craiova 1948 players
FC Dinamo București players
FC Argeș Pitești players
CS Mioveni players
Tianjin Jinmen Tiger F.C. players
Chongqing Liangjiang Athletic F.C. players
Expatriate footballers in Switzerland
Expatriate footballers in Romania
Liga I players
Chinese Super League players
Expatriate footballers in China
Stade d'Abidjan players
Ivorian expatriate sportspeople in Romania
Ivorian expatriate sportspeople in China
Footballers from Abidjan